The 2009 FIFA Club World Cup took place in Abu Dhabi, United Arab Emirates, from 9 December to 19 December 2009. Each of the seven teams involved were required to submit a provisional 30-man squad list (including a minimum of three goalkeepers) by 29 October 2009. The final 23-man squads had to be submitted by 25 November, with all members of the final squad taken from the provisional list. All players were required to be registered with squad numbers between 1 and 23, unless they were registered for their domestic league with a different number. In the event of an injury to one of the players on the final list, that player may be replaced with a player from the provisional list no less than 24 hours before his team's first match in the competition.

Al-Ahli
Manager:  Mahdi Redha

Atlante
Manager:  José Guadalupe Cruz

Auckland City
Manager:  Paul Posa

Barcelona
Manager:  Pep Guardiola

Estudiantes de La Plata
Manager:  Alejandro Sabella

Pohang Steelers
Manager:  Sérgio Farias

TP Mazembe
Manager:  Diego Garzitto

References
Tournament regulations
Provisional list of players
Official list of players

Squads
FIFA Club World Cup squads